Naphthalocyanine is a cross-shaped organic molecule consisting of 48 carbon, 8 nitrogen and 26 hydrogen atoms, it is a derivative of phthalocyanine. IBM Research labs used it for developing single-molecule logic switches and visualizing charge distribution in a single molecule.

Naphthalocyanine derivatives have a potential use in photodynamic cancer treatment.

References

External links
 Timmer, J. (2007) Storing data in molecules: shifting atoms and flipping bits, ars technica online [accessed 8 September 2007]

Phthalocyanines
Molecular electronics